Pseudcraspedia is a genus of moths of the family Erebidae. The genus was erected by George Hampson in 1898.

Species
 Pseudcraspedia basipunctaria Walker (from Florida)
 Pseudcraspedia holopolia Dyar, 1914 (from Trinidad)
 Pseudcraspedia leucozona Hampson, 1910 (from Colombia)
 Pseudcraspedia mathetes Dyar, 1914 (from Trinidad)
 Pseudcraspedia prosticta Hampson, 1910 (Uganda, Sri Lanka)
 Pseudcraspedia punctata Hampson, 1898 (Kenya, Uganda, Australia, India, Vietnam)
 Pseudcraspedia sodis Dyar, 1914 (from Trinidad)

References

Boletobiinae
Noctuoidea genera